Grinton is a small village and civil parish in the Yorkshire Dales, in the Richmondshire district of North Yorkshire, England.

On 5 July 2014, the Tour de France Stage 1 from Leeds to Harrogate passed through the village.

St Andrew's church

Often called "The Cathedral of the Dales", Grinton church is dedicated to St Andrew and was for centuries the main church for the whole of upper Swaledale, with many burials coming from miles away. The bodies were carried as much as 16 miles down the valley along the footpath from Keld, now known as the Corpse Way or corpse road, in wicker coffins. Several long stones, located at intervals along the path, traditionally called "coffin stones", are said to be where the coffin would have been set down while the pallbearers rested.

Fragments of the old Norman church remain, including the font and the tower arch, which dates from the late 12th century. Other parts of the building date from the late 13th or early 14th century, and the pulpit is Jacobean, but St Andrew's is now mainly a 15th-century rebuild.

The church is often used as a venue for concerts during the Swaledale Festival and at other times. It was  featured in the British television series All Creatures Great and Small, in the episode "Brotherly Love".

Other notable features
The stone bridge across the River Swale was widened in the 18th century. The river is reputedly the fastest-flowing in England, and Grinton is the first point above Richmond where it could normally be forded.

Blackburn Hall, between the churchyard and the river, dates from 1635.

The Bridge Inn is popular with walkers and is a venue for weekly folk music sessions, normally held on Thursday evenings.

Above the village, on the Leyburn road is YHA Grinton Lodge, a former shooting lodge which is now a youth hostel. Further on from the youth hostel, just off the road, is the site of Grinton Smelt Mill, a lead processing site built in the 19th century.

References

External links

 Grinton in Swaledale website
 The Corpse Way Project
 A church near you website

Villages in North Yorkshire
Civil parishes in North Yorkshire
Swaledale